Višňov is a village and municipality in the Trebišov District in the Košice Region of south-eastern Slovakia.

History
In historical records the village was first mentioned in 1270.

Geography
The village lies at an altitude of 122 metres and covers an area of 4.763 km².
It has a population of about 220 people.

Ethnicity
The village is about 99% Slovak.

Facilities
The village has a public library.

External links
https://web.archive.org/web/20071116010355/http://www.statistics.sk/mosmis/eng/run.html
Official Internet page of Višňov (Slovak language)

Villages and municipalities in Trebišov District